The Mother Tongue is a book by Bill Bryson which compiles the history and origins of the English language and its various quirks. It is subtitled English And How It Got That Way. The book discusses the Indo-European origins of English, the growing status of English as a global language, the complex etymology of English words, the dialects of English, spelling reform, prescriptive grammar, and more minor topics including swearing. This account popularises the subject and makes it accessible to the lay reader, but it has been criticised for some inaccuracies, such as the perpetuation of several urban myths.

This book has also been published in Great Britain by Penguin Books under the title Mother Tongue: The English Language.

Bryson has since followed up this work with Made in America.

External links
The Mother Tongue on Google Books (preview)

1991 non-fiction books
Books by Bill Bryson
Linguistics books
History of the English language